In mathematics,  Dolgachev surfaces are certain simply connected elliptic surfaces, introduced by . They can be used to give examples of an infinite family of homeomorphic simply connected compact 4-manifolds, no two of which are diffeomorphic.

Properties
The blowup  of the projective plane in 9 points can be realized as an elliptic fibration all of whose fibers are irreducible.

The Dolgachev surfaces are simply connected, and the bilinear form on the second cohomology group is odd of signature  (so it is the unimodular lattice ). The geometric genus  is 0 and the Kodaira dimension is 1.

 showed that the Dolgachev surface  has a handlebody decomposition without 1- and 3-handles.

References

Algebraic surfaces
Complex surfaces